Stefan Reisinger (born 14 September 1981) is a German football manager and former player who most recently managed KFC Uerdingen.

Playing career
Reisinger began his career with SV Essenbach and joined in 1993 SpVgg Landshut. Until 2001, he played for Landshut and moved in the summer of the same year to SpVgg Greuther Fürth. Reisinger was then in summer 2003 transferred from Greuther Fürth to SV Wacker Burghausen and was in 2005 scouted from TSV 1860 Munich. He signed for a transfer fee of 400.000 € a contract until 30 June 2007. After one year with 1860 Munich, he wanted move to MSV Duisburg but the transfer failed and he returned to former club Greuther Fürth. On 15 April 2009, Reisinger signed a contract with SC Freiburg and joined to the club on 1 July 2009.

Managerial career
On 31 January 2019, Reisinger was named caretaker manager of KFC Uerdingen for one game until he was replaced on 3 February 2019. On 25 September 2019, he was once again called up as caretaker manager for Uerdingen until 16 October 2019. On 16 October 2019, Reisinger, in a joint venture with Daniel Steuernagel, were announced as KFC Uerdingen's new managers. After they were replaced in March 2020, he was once again called up on to manager the team after Stefan Krämer got sacked.

References

External links

1981 births
Living people
Sportspeople from Landshut
German footballers
Footballers from Bavaria
Association football forwards
Bundesliga players
2. Bundesliga players
SpVgg Greuther Fürth players
SV Wacker Burghausen players
TSV 1860 Munich players
SC Freiburg players
Fortuna Düsseldorf players
1. FC Saarbrücken players
3. Liga players
German football managers
3. Liga managers
KFC Uerdingen 05 managers